Floyd "Jumbo" Cummings (born 20 December 1949) is an American former professional boxer best known for his fight with Joe Frazier.

Cummings served 12 years in prison for murder in the Stateville Correctional Center, Illinois, and upon his release started boxing professionally, making his debut in March 1979 at the age of 29.

He was a fringe contender in the heavyweight division in the early 1980s, fighting such opponents as Tim Witherspoon, Renaldo Snipes, and Mitch Green, losing decisions against all three. In his last fight, Cummings was stopped by Frank Bruno. Though Bruno was somewhat fortunate to survive a right hand blow on the bell of round one that left him severely dazed and on the back foot till late in the second, from which Bruno had to be helped to his corner by Terry Lawless.

He is notable for having been the final opponent of former heavyweight champion Joe Frazier, when Frazier made a brief comeback in 1981; the fight was scored a draw. Cummings ended his career with a record of 15 wins, six losses, and one draw.

In 2002, Cummings was sentenced to life imprisonment for armed robbery.
In August 2016, Cummings was released from prison.

Professional boxing record

|-
|align="center" colspan=8|15 Wins (13 knockouts, 2 decisions), 6 Losses (2 knockouts, 4 decisions), 1 Draw 
|-
| align="center" style="border-style: none none solid solid; background: #e3e3e3"|Result
| align="center" style="border-style: none none solid solid; background: #e3e3e3"|Record
| align="center" style="border-style: none none solid solid; background: #e3e3e3"|Opp. Record
| align="center" style="border-style: none none solid solid; background: #e3e3e3"|Opponent
| align="center" style="border-style: none none solid solid; background: #e3e3e3"|Type
| align="center" style="border-style: none none solid solid; background: #e3e3e3"|Round
| align="center" style="border-style: none none solid solid; background: #e3e3e3"|Date
| align="center" style="border-style: none none solid solid; background: #e3e3e3"|Location
| align="center" style="border-style: none none solid solid; background: #e3e3e3"|Notes
|-
|Loss
|15-6-1
|
|align=left| Frank Bruno
|TKO
|7
|11/10/1983
|align=left| Royal Albert Hall, London, England
|align=left|
|-
|Loss
|15-5-1
|
|align=left| Tim Witherspoon
|UD
|10
|16/07/1983
|align=left| The Dunes, Paradise, Nevada, U.S.
|align=left|
|-
|Loss
|15-4-1
|
|align=left| Mitch Green
|UD
|10
|16/02/1983
|align=left| Meadowlands Arena, East Rutherford, New Jersey, U.S.
|align=left|
|-
|Loss
|15-3-1
|
|align=left| Larry Frazier
|PTS
|10
|14/08/1982
|align=left| Stouffers Ballroom, Cleveland, Ohio, U.S.
|align=left|
|-
|Loss
|15-2-1
|
|align=left| Jeff Sims
|KO
|8
|02/05/1982
|align=left| Playboy Hotel and Casino, Atlantic City, New Jersey, U.S.
|align=left|
|-
|Draw
|15-1-1
|
|align=left| Joe Frazier
|MD
|10
|03/12/1981
|align=left| International Amphitheatre, Chicago, Illinois, U.S.
|align=left|
|-
|Win
|15-1
|
|align=left| Bobby Jordan
|KO
|9
|27/07/1981
|align=left| International Amphitheatre, Chicago, Illinois, U.S.
|align=left|
|-
|Loss
|14-1
|
|align=left| Renaldo Snipes
|UD
|10
|08/03/1981
|align=left| Resorts Casino Hotel, Atlantic City, New Jersey, U.S.
|align=left|
|-
|Win
|14-0
|
|align=left| Al Jones
|KO
|1
|15/01/1981
|align=left| Hilton Hotel, Chicago, Illinois, U.S.
|align=left|
|-
|Win
|13-0
|
|align=left| George Mostardini
|TKO
|8
|11/12/1980
|align=left| International Amphitheatre, Chicago, Illinois, U.S.
|align=left|
|-
|Win
|12-0
|
|align=left| Johnny Warr
|SD
|10
|10/09/1980
|align=left| Cicero Stadium, Chicago, Illinois, U.S.
|align=left|
|-
|Win
|11-0
|
|align=left| Jesse Clark
|KO
|1
|25/08/1980
|align=left| Bismark Hotel, Chicago, Illinois, U.S.
|align=left|
|-
|Win
|10-0
|
|align=left| Mike Jackson
|KO
|3
|12/06/1980
|align=left| Hilton Hotel, Chicago, Illinois, U.S.
|align=left|
|-
|Win
|9-0
|
|align=left| Charles A. Atlas
|TKO
|1
|15/05/1980
|align=left| Aragon Ballroom, Chicago, Illinois, U.S.
|align=left|
|-
|Win
|8-0
|
|align=left| Vic Wallace
|KO
|2
|17/04/1980
|align=left| Aragon Ballroom, Chicago, Illinois, U.S.
|align=left|
|-
|Win
|7-0
|
|align=left| Amos Haynes
|KO
|2
|18/02/1980
|align=left| Aragon Ballroom, Chicago, Illinois, U.S.
|align=left|
|-
|Win
|6-0
|
|align=left| Sylvester Wilder
|TKO
|2
|01/02/1980
|align=left| International Amphitheatre, Chicago, Illinois, U.S.
|align=left|
|-
|Win
|5-0
|
|align=left| Larry Sims
|UD
|6
|15/12/1979
|align=left| Circle Arena, Chicago, Illinois, U.S.
|align=left|
|-
|Win
|4-0
|
|align=left| Cornell Verse
|KO
|4
|20/11/1979
|align=left| Circle Arena, Chicago, Illinois, U.S.
|align=left|
|-
|Win
|3-0
|
|align=left| George Gofarth
|TKO
|4
|30/07/1979
|align=left| International Amphitheatre, Chicago, Illinois, U.S.
|align=left|
|-
|Win
|2-0
|
|align=left| Jim Flynn
|KO
|1
|20/07/1979
|align=left| UIC Pavilion, Chicago, Illinois, U.S.
|align=left|
|-
|Win
|1-0
|
|align=left| Dave Watkins
|KO
|1
|18/06/1979
|align=left| Arnie's North Restaurant, Highland Park, Illinois, U.S.
|align=left|
|}

References

External links
 

1949 births
Boxers from Mississippi
Heavyweight boxers
American people convicted of murder
American sportspeople convicted of crimes
Living people
American male boxers